George Sutton Watson (10 April 1907 – 1 April 1974) was an English cricketer and footballer.

Born in Milton Regis in Kent, Watson was educated at Shrewsbury School. He appeared in eight first-class games for Kent's First XI between 1928 and 1929, having played for the Second XI since 1926. He played the vast majority of his cricket instead for Leicestershire - 225 appearances and over 8000 runs as a professional. His 1973 obituary in Wisden described him as "an attacking bat and a glorious field." His right-handed batting brought him five centuries for Leicestershire, and he took a single wicket with very occasional left-arm medium pace bowling.

A keen footballer, he also played twice for England in 1930 as an amateur, and played for Charlton Athletic, Maidstone United, Crystal Palace, Nuneaton Town and Gloucester City.

He died in Guildford, Surrey, in 1974.

References

External links
 

1907 births
1974 deaths
People from Sittingbourne
People educated at Shrewsbury School
Kent cricketers
Minor Counties cricketers
Leicestershire cricketers
Combined Services cricketers
English footballers
Charlton Athletic F.C. players
Gloucester City A.F.C. players
Crystal Palace F.C. players
Association footballers not categorized by position
M. Leyland's XI cricketers
People from the Borough of Swale